Lisis et Délie (or Lysis et Délie) was a one-act pastoral opera with music by Jean-Philippe Rameau and  a libretto by Jean-François Marmontel. The musical score is now lost. It was scheduled to appear at Fontainebleau on 6 November 1753 as part of the celebrations for the birth of the royal prince Xavier, Duke of Aquitaine. It was due to form a double bill with the comédie-ballet Les hommes (words by Germain-François Poullain de Saint-Foix, music by François-Joseph Giraud). However, it was withdrawn from performance and "La danse", the third entrée of Rameau's Les fêtes d'Hébé, was performed in its place. The reason given for the work's cancellation was that it was too similar to Rameau's Daphnis et Eglé, premiered at Fontainebleau on 30 October.  The libretto was published but the music does not survive. Rameau may have reused some of it in his later operas.

Roles

Synopsis
Scene: a wood with views of the countryside; a hamlet in the distance
The shepherd Lisis laments his unrequited love for Délie. Délie offers him only friendship, saying love is merely a fleeting passion. Lisis arouses her jealousy by pretending he has fallen for another shepherdess, Alcyone. Lisis arranges a festival in honour of Alcyone in which the shepherds and shepherdesses play the roles of the gods of the countryside. Délie finally admits her love for Lisis and the opera ends in celebration.

References

Sources
Bouissou, Sylvie Jean-Philippe Rameau: Musicien des lumières (Fayard, 2014)
Girdlestone, Cuthbert, Jean-Philippe Rameau: His Life and Work, New York: Dover, 1969  (paperback edition)
Sadler, Graham The Rameau Compendium (Boydell Press, 2014)

Operas by Jean-Philippe Rameau
French-language operas
Operas
1753 operas
Lost operas